The Putna is a right tributary of the river Bistricioara in Romania. Upstream from its confluence with the Putna Întunecoasă in the village of Hagota, it is also called Putna Noroioasă. It discharges into the Bistricioara in Tulgheș.

Tributaries

The following rivers are tributaries to the river Putna (from source to mouth):

Left: Rezu Mare
Right: Putna Întunecoasă, Șumuleu, Călugăru Mic, Balaj, Marcu

References

Rivers of Romania
Rivers of Harghita County